Chaqataram (also Romanized as  Chaqāţaram, Chagā Ţarm, Chaghāţūm, and Chogāţarm; also known as Chaghāţar) is a village in Pachehlak-e Sharqi Rural District, in the Central District of Aligudarz County, Lorestan Province, Iran. At the 2006 census, its population was 131, in 26 families.

References 

Towns and villages in Aligudarz County